Craibia brevicaudata is a species of medium to large evergreen trees from family Fabaceae found in Angola, Ethiopia, Kenya, Malawi, Mozambique, Tanzania, Zaire, Zambia, and Zimbabwe. The leaves are imparipinnate and have 5–7 leaflets, which are dark green coloured, are leathery and almost hairless. The plants petiole is swelled. The flowers are compactly racemed, and are white-greenish at the center. The pods are flat, and creamy-gray, and carry reddish-brown seeds.

References

Millettieae
Flora of Africa